Pop Is... is a compilation album by Mint Royale, released on 19 February 2007 on Faith & Hope Records. It is a retrospective compilation, including a variety of Mint Royale's works over the past ten years.

Track listing
 "Don't Falter" (featuring. Lauren Laverne) – 4:15
 "Singin' in the Rain" (featuring. Gene Kelly) – 3:26
 "Show Me" (featuring. Pos from De La Soul) – 3:57
 "Blue Song" – 4:20
 "Take It Easy" – 5:10
 "Elephant Stone" (Mint Royale Remix) by the Stone Roses – 3:30
 "Something New" – 5:05
 "Sexiest Man in Jamaica" – 4:42
 "From Rusholme with Love" – 5:08
 "Kenny's Last Dance" - 5:24
 "Wait for You" – 4:19
 "The Effect on Me" – 3:57
 "Dancehall Places" - 3:52
 "Wham! Bar" – 3:01
The following songs are included in the iTunes Store version of the album:
 "Princess (Version 2 Bonus Track)" – 4:17
 "Trickshot (Bonus Track)" – 5:01
 "Phlump (Bonus Track)" – 3:31
 "Don't Falter (Mint Mix Bonus Track)" featuring Lauren Laverne – 5:38
"Rest Your Head"

References

Mint Royale albums
2007 compilation albums